FC U Craiova 1948 is a Romanian football club which currently plays in Liga I.

Total statistics

Statistics by country

Statistics by competition 

Notes for the abbreviations in the tables below:

 1R: First round
 2R: Second round
 PR: Preliminary round
 QR: Qualifying round

UEFA Champions League / European Cup

UEFA Cup Winners' Cup / European Cup Winners' Cup

UEFA Europa League / UEFA Cup

UEFA Intertoto Cup

References

Romanian football clubs in international competitions
European